Hardison is a surname. Notable people with the surname include:

 Benjamin Hardison (1761–1823), farmer, miller and political figure in Upper Canada
 Casey William Hardison (born 1971), American chemist
 Dee Hardison (born 1956), former American football defensive lineman in the National Football League
 Harold Hardison (1923–2015), American politician from North Carolina
 Kadeem Hardison (born 1965), American actor
 Marcus Hardison (born 1992), American football player
 Wallace Hardison (1850–1909), one of the founders of Union Oil
 Ross Hardison, American biochemist and molecular biologist

Fictional characters:
 Alec Hardison, a fictional hacker from the TV series Leverage

See also
 O. B. Hardison Jr. Poetry Prize, awarded to honor a U.S. poet whose art and teaching demonstrate great imagination and daring